Ernest Crage (4 May 1873 – 29 December 1951) was a South African cricketer. He played in two first-class matches for Eastern Province in 1893/94.

See also
 List of Eastern Province representative cricketers

References

External links
 

1873 births
1951 deaths
South African cricketers
Eastern Province cricketers
Cricketers from Port Elizabeth